Watch the Birdies was a 1966 British television mini-series based on a screenplay by Peter Yeldham that aired on the BBC. The series was a five-part thriller series about a detective who gets involved in the London underworld through investigation of the world of fashion photography. All five episodes were wiped and are believed to be lost.

Rolf von Sydow directed in 1969 a West German remake of it named Bitte recht freundlich, es wird geschossen.

References

External links
Watch the Birdies on IMDb

1966 British television series debuts
1966 British television series endings
Lost BBC episodes
English-language television shows
1960s British drama television series
1960s British television miniseries
Black-and-white British television shows